Ostichthys is a genus of fish in the family Holocentridae found in Atlantic, Indian and Pacific Ocean.

Species
Fifteen species in this genus are recognized:
 Ostichthys acanthorhinus J. E. Randall, Shimizu & Yamakawa, 1982 (spiny-snout soldierfish)
 Ostichthys archiepiscopus (Valenciennes, 1862) (straight-head soldierfish)
 Ostichthys brachygnathus J. E. Randall & R. F. Myers, 1993 (short-jaw soldierfish)
 Ostichthys convexus D. W. Greenfield, J. E. Randall & Psomadakis, 2017 (round-head soldierfish) 
 Ostichthys daniela D. W. Greenfield, J. E. Randall & Psomadakis, 2017 (Daniela's soldierfish) 
 Ostichthys delta J. E. Randall, Shimizu & Yamakawa, 1982 (red-coat soldierfish)
 Ostichthys hypsipterygion J. E. Randall, Shimizu & Yamakawa, 1982 (high-fin soldierfish)
 Ostichthys hypsufensis Golani, 1984 (Red Sea soldierfish) 
 Ostichthys japonicus (G. Cuvier, 1829) (Japanese soldierfish)
 Ostichthys kaianus (Günther, 1880) (deep-water soldierfish)
 Ostichthys kinchi R. Fricke, 2017 (New Ireland soldierfish) 
 Ostichthys ovaloculus J. E. Randall & Wrobel, 1988 (oval-eye soldierfish)
 Ostichthys sandix J. E. Randall, Shimizu & Yamakawa, 1982 (vermilion soldierfish)
 Ostichthys sheni J. P. Chen, K. T. Shao & H. K. Mok, 1990 (Shen's soldierfish)
 Ostichthys spiniger Fricke, 2017 (western pacific spinysnout soldierfish)
 Ostichthys trachypoma (Günther, 1859) (big-eye soldierfish)

References

 
Marine fish genera
Taxa named by Georges Cuvier